At least two ships of the Argentine Navy have been named Parker:

 , a  commissioned in 1937 and decommissioned in 1963.
 , an  launched in 1984.

Argentine Navy ship names